The 2022–23 season is the 134th season in the existence of Sheffield United Football Club and the club's second consecutive season in the Championship. In addition to the league, they will also compete in the 2022–23 FA Cup and the 2022–23 EFL Cup.

Squad statistics

Appearances and goals
Updated 19 March 2023

|-
! colspan=14 style=background:#DCDCDC; text-align:center| Goalkeepers   
                                             

|-
! colspan=14 style=background:#DCDCDC; text-align:center| Defenders

|-
! colspan=14 style=background:#DCDCDC; text-align:center| Midfielders

|-
! colspan=14 style=background:#DCDCDC;                                 text-align:center| Forwards

  
|-    
!colspan=14|Player(s) out on loan:
 
|-
!colspan=14|Players who left the club:
                        
|}

Goals

Transfers

Transfers in

Loans in

Transfers out

Loans out

Pre-season and friendlies
On June 1, Sheffield United announced their pre-season plans, along with a training camp in Lisbon. During the Blades time in Portugal they confirmed they would face Casa Pia. A behind-closed-doors meeting with Mansfield Town was later added to the schedule.

Competitions

Overall record

Championship

League table

Results summary

Results by round

Matches

On 23 June, the league fixtures were announced.

FA Cup

The Blades were drawn away to Millwall in the third round and to Wrexham in the fourth round.

EFL Cup

Sheffield United were drawn away to West Bromwich Albion in the first round.

References

Sheffield United
Sheffield United F.C. seasons
English football clubs 2022–23 season